Youssef Khanfar Al-Shakali (born 1 January 1972) is an Omani cyclist. He competed in the men's individual road race at the 1996 Summer Olympics.

References

1972 births
Living people
Omani male cyclists
Olympic cyclists of Oman
Cyclists at the 1996 Summer Olympics
Place of birth missing (living people)